Herning is a Danish town in the Central Denmark Region of the Jutland peninsula. It is the main town and the administrative seat of Herning Municipality. Herning has a population of 50,565 (1 January 2022) including the suburbs of Tjørring, Snejbjerg, Lind, Birk, Hammerum, and Gjellerup, making Herning the 11th most populous urban area in Denmark.

History
Herning was established at the beginning of the 1790s, during the period of heath reclamation, as a commercial centre providing goods and services to the farmers in the area. A textile industry later developed in and around the town. This industry was once Herning's principal economic activity. Today, the town has a more diversified industrial base. Herning became a market town in 1913. Herning has twice been awarded the title of Danish City of the Year.

Industry
There are many small furniture and textile businesses in and around Herning.

Attractions
Herning is home to Messecenter Herning, the largest exhibition centre in Scandinavia, which hosts many trade fairs.

Carl-Henning Pedersen and Else Alfelt's Museum of Art (also known as Herning Art Museum) is located in the city.

The city is the site of three buildings designed by the architect Jørn Utzon. One is publicly owned and two are privately owned.

The town is also home to sculptor Ingvar Cronhammar's monumental work Elia. The sculpture is located near the Herning Art Museum.

The old Herningsholm Estate in Herning is open to the public for touring. Classensborg Estate, now called Skarrildhus, is located 25 km south of the town, but is closed to the public because it is a private hotel and educational facility. The grounds, however, can be toured and are known for their beautiful rhododendron displays during the spring.

The Herning Museum displays a history of Herning, as well as the development of moorland agriculture and ancient textile production. The museum operates traveling educational exhibits.

Sports
Herning Blue Fox is a Danish professional ice hockey team playing in the top Danish ice hockey league, the Oddset Ligaen. Having won 16 championships and 29 medals in all (following the 2011–2012 season), Herning Blue Fox has accumulated the greatest number of victories in the history of professional ice hockey in Denmark.

FC Midtjylland is a football team playing in the Danish Superliga. It was formed in 1999 following a merger of Herning Fremad and Ikast FS and won the national championship of Denmark for the first time in 2015 having twice been the runner up. FC Midtjylland play their home matches at MCH Arena, which is situated next to the largest sports and concert venue in Denmark, Jyske Bank Boxen.

Herning also is a centre of Danish cycling. The GP Herning is a professional bicycle race held annually in Herning. The 2012 Giro d'Italia started in Herning. Bjarne Riis, first Dane to win the Tour de France, was born in Herning. Fourteen years after his win, Riis admitted using illegal performance-enhancing drugs for the competition; however, he retained the Trikot since the statute of limitations had already expired prior to his admission.

The final of the 2019 World Men's Handball Championship was played in Jyske Bank Boxen.

Herning has been appointed to host the ECCO FEI World Championships - Denmark 2022 in jumping, dressage, para-dressage and vaulting

Transport

Road and rail

Herning is the hub for both road and rail transport in central Jutland. The rail lines crossing the peninsula intersect at Herning railway station, the principal railway station of the town, with connections to Vejle, Århus, Esbjerg and Holstebro. There are also several daily trains to Copenhagen. The town is also served by the railway halts Birk Centerpark and Herning Messecenter.

Herning lies at the intersection of three major roads: route 18, that traverses the Jutland Peninsula from southeast to northwest; route 15, that crosses the peninsula from Aarhus in the east to Ringkobing in the west; and route 12, from Esbjerg in the southwest to Viborg to the northeast.

Airport
There are several flights a day connecting it to Copenhagen Airport.

Notable people 

 Anton Marius Jenssen (1879–1967) a Norwegian merchant and politician.
 Professor Gudmund Hatt (1884 in Vildbjerg – 1960) an archaeologist and cultural geographer
 Captain Richard Gustav Borgelin (1887–1966) company commander of the Danish-Baltic Auxiliary Corps
 Børge Møller Grimstrup (1906 in Timring – 1972) a Danish film actor 
 Niels Holst-Sørensen (born 1922) former Danish athlete, air force officer and commander-in-chief of the Royal Danish Air Force
 Eva Sørensen (1940–2019) a Danish sculptor and ceramist of granite and marble works
 Lars Larsen (born 1948 in Arnborg) a Danish businessman, owner and founder of Jysk
 Helge Sander (born 1950 in Ørre) a national politician and Mayor of Herning 1998 to 2001
 Kristine Jensen (born 1956) a Danish architect who has specialized in landscape architecture
 Claus Pilgaard (born 1965 in Tjørring) a Danish musician and entertainer
 Jesper Baehrenz (born 1965) a Danish radio & TV host, producer and  board game developer 
 Søren Pind (born 1969) a Danish lawyer and Venstre politician
 Dorthe Nors (born 1970) a Danish writer
 Ellen Trane Nørby (born 1980) a Danish Venstre politician, Minister of Health

Sport 

 Otto Jensen (1893–1972) a Danish cyclist, competed in the 1912 Summer Olympics
 Kristen Nygaard (born 1949 in Sund) a former footballer, 363 club caps and 36 for Denmark
 Bjarne Riis (born 1964) a Danish former professional road bicycle racer
 Claus Elming (born 1969) a former Danish American football player, TV host on TV 2 Sport
 Gitte Madsen [born 1969) a former team handball player, team gold medallist at the 1996 Summer Olympics
 Michael Blaudzun (born 1973) a Danish former professional road bicycle racer
 Kenneth Jonassen (born 1974) a badminton player
 Jesper Nøddesbo (born 1980) Danish-Norwegian handball player for FC Barcelona and Denmark
 Rasmus Ankersen (born 1983) Chairman of FC Midtjylland and a Director of Football at Brentford F.C. and author
 Frans Nielsen (born 1984) hockey player for the Detroit Red Wings, the first Danish NHL player
 Michael Pedersen (born 1986) a Danish cricketer and former national team captain
 Frederik Andersen (born 1989) goaltender for the Carolina Hurricanes
 Kim Astrup (born 1992) a Danish badminton player
 Nicklas Jensen (born 1993) a Danish hockey player currently playing for Jokerit of the KHL
 Nicklas Porsing (born 1993) a Danish speedway rider
 Oliver Bjorkstrand (born 1995) a professional ice hockey player

References

External links

Webpage of Herning Municipality

 
Municipal seats of the Central Denmark Region
Municipal seats of Denmark
Cities and towns in the Central Denmark Region
Herning Municipality